Riddel may refer to:

 Riddels, or riddel curtains, posts, rails etc, curtains at the sides of a church altar.
 Peter Riddel (died 1641), English politician
 Eliza and Isabella Riddel, who endowed Riddel Hall to Queen's University Belfast in 1913
 Riddel (Chrono Cross), a fictional character

See also
 Riddell (disambiguation)
 Riddle (disambiguation)
 Ridel